Megan Sileno (born 1 May 1989) is a South African water polo player, and coach. She is a member of the South Africa women's national water polo team. She was part of the team in the women's water polo tournament at the 2020 Summer Olympics.

She coaches at St. Anne's Diocesan College.

References 

Living people
South African female water polo players
Water polo players at the 2020 Summer Olympics
Olympic water polo players of South Africa
1989 births
Sportspeople from Cape Town